The 12649 / 12650 Karnataka Sampark Kranti Express of Karnataka is a train service of Sampark Kranti Express series in India, which runs between Yesvantpur in Bangalore to  in Delhi. It provides a  substitute to the Karnataka Express and also of superfast category. The frequency of these trains in compilation of all the Sampark Kranti is daily. These trains provide an alternative link between Bangalore City railway station and  stations.

History
The train was introduced 8 February 2004.
The train was introduced as a bi-weekly for initial years, and then existed as a tri-weekly train for some later years. At present the train runs five times a week. Later-on the second version of the train was introduced in 2009. It had a longer route than the parent train. It was introduced as a bi-weekly train. It was an alternative train for trains like Goa Express, Jhelum Express and –Mysore Swarna Jayanti Express. Mainly the train was introduced for passengers of Hubli and Pune.

In late 2012, another longer bi-weekly train was introduced till  via Delhi. The schedule of both the longer trains were synchronized from Yeshwantpur to Delhi. For some technical reasons the schedule of the trains was increased. Normally the train used to take 3 hours between Bhopal and Jhansi, whereas the trains now take 6 hours between them, which includes a whole night. The technical stops with the duration of the halt were also increased.

Route & Halts

   
  
 
 
 
 
 
 
 
 
 
 
  
  
  
  
  
 ,

Traction

Both trains are hauled by a Krishnarajapuram-based WDP-4D locomotive from YPR to KCG and handing over to a Lallaguda-based WAP-7 locomotive from KCG to NZM.

Rake sharing
The train shares its rake with 12629/12630 Karnataka Sampark Kranti Express (via Hubballi).

Relevance
Sampark Kranti Express were introduced to provide faster connectivity from other than state capitals to the Country capital. Sampark Kranti i.e. revolution in connectivity was aimed at providing a very fast connectivity. 12649/50 travels faster than the Karnataka Express and is quite preferred.

Speed
Karnataka Sampark Kranti Express runs at an average speed of approx 65 km/h (40.3m/h)and peak speed approx 110 km/h (68.3m/h). Whereas the peak speed of 12649/50 is between Dharmavaram Junction and  Dhone Junction which is 95 km/h.

Gallery

References

External links

Transport in Bangalore
Transport in Delhi
Sampark Kranti Express trains
Rail transport in Karnataka
Rail transport in Uttar Pradesh
Rail transport in Madhya Pradesh
Rail transport in Haryana
Rail transport in Maharashtra
Rail transport in Delhi